Rashtriya Janata Party was a political party in Gujarat, India. It was a splinter group of Bharatiya Janata Party. This group was led by Shankersinh Vaghela and Dilip Parikh. It was later dissolved and its leaders joined the Indian National Congress.

In 1995, BJP won a majority of 121 legislators out of a 182-member Legislative Assembly, who expressed a preference for Shankersinh Vaghela as their leader. Narendra Modi is said to have thrown his weight behind Keshubhai Patel in preference to Vaghela and held responsible for the ensuing events. However, the BJP leadership installed Keshubhai Patel as the Chief Minister and the support for Vaghela was gradually eroded.

In September 1995, Vaghela rebelled against the BJP leadership with the support of 47 MLAs. Vaghela lost Godhra seat in May 1996 Lok Sabha polls, and soon left Bharatiya Janata Party with his supporters, bringing down Suresh Mehta's government. He floated his own party, named Rashtriya Janta Party and became Chief Minister with Indian National Congress's support in October 1996.

He won bye-poll to Gujarat Assembly from Radhanpur seat in early 1997. But he had to resign as Chief Minister during ongoing political turmoil in Gujarat in October 1997 and his fellow-rebel ex-BJP MLA Dilip Parikh became CM with Vaghela's reluctant blessings. Even Parikh's government did not last long and fresh elections for Gujarat Vidhan Sabha had to be called in 1998. Vaghela did not contest these elections. He merged his new party with Indian National Congress.

References

Defunct political parties in Gujarat
Political schisms
Political parties established in 1995
1995 establishments in Gujarat